Faith Baptist School is a private, evangelical Baptist Christian school located in Davison, Michigan, United States. It houses grades kindergarten through 12.

Baptist schools in the United States
Christian schools in Michigan
Private elementary schools in Michigan
Private high schools in Michigan
Private middle schools in Michigan
Educational institutions established in 1978
Schools in Genesee County, Michigan
1978 establishments in Michigan